Signs is a 2002 American science fiction horror film written and directed by M. Night Shyamalan and produced by Shyamalan, Frank Marshall, Kathleen Kennedy and Sam Mercer. The film was produced by Blinding Edge Pictures and The Kennedy/Marshall Company. It was commercially distributed by Touchstone Pictures theatrically, and by Touchstone Home Entertainment in home media format. Its story focuses on a former Episcopal priest named Graham Hess, played by Mel Gibson, who discovers a series of crop circles in his cornfield and that the phenomenon is a result of extraterrestrial life. It also stars Joaquin Phoenix, Rory Culkin, and Abigail Breslin. Signs explores the themes of faith, kinship, and extraterrestrials.

Following its premiere in theatres nationwide on August 2, 2002, the film grossed $227,966,634 in domestic ticket receipts screening at 3,453 theatres during its widest release. It earned an additional $180,281,283 in business through international release, to top out at a combined $408,247,917 in gross revenue. The film was nominated for multiple awards, including those from the Online Film Critics Society and the Empire Awards. The film also won an award from the American Society of Composers, Authors and Publishers. Considering its $72 million budget costs, the film was considered a strong financial success after its theatrical run and was met with positive reviews from critics, with many praising its atmosphere, cinematography, score, and story but others criticizing aspects of the script. The high-definition Blu-ray Disc edition of the film featuring the director's audio commentary, the making of the film, and deleted scenes was released in the United States on June 3, 2008. The original motion picture soundtrack, which was composed by James Newton Howard, was released on the opening day by the Hollywood Records label.

Plot

Former Episcopal priest Graham Hess lives on a rural farm in Doylestown, Pennsylvania, with his asthmatic preteen son, Morgan, and young daughter, Bo. Graham's younger brother Merrill, a failed minor league baseball player, has been helping the family since Graham's wife Colleen died in a traffic accident six months earlier. Graham abandoned the church in the aftermath of the incident.

When large crop circles appear in the Hess' cornfield, they are initially attributed to vandals. However, other crop circles begin to appear globally, and lights from invisible objects hover over many of Earth's cities. One night, Graham and Merrill chase a figure into the field. Over the next several days, Graham glimpses another among the corn stalks, followed by strange clicking noises broadcast through Bo's old baby monitor. To the family's continued terror, news footage emerges of what appears to be an alien.

After receiving a phone call from Ray Reddy, the man responsible for his wife's death, Graham travels to Reddy’s home and finds him sitting in his car outside of the house. Reddy expresses remorse for Colleen's death and warns Graham that a creature is locked inside his pantry. Believing that the aliens avoid water, he leaves for a lakeside. Graham enters the house and uses a kitchen knife to peer under the pantry door. A clawed hand emerges and swipes at Graham; he cuts off the fingers in a panic.

As the worldwide alien invasion begins, the family barricades themselves inside their house. When the aliens break-in, the family takes shelter in the basement. Morgan has an asthma attack but survives the night. The family emerges the next morning after the radio reports that the aliens have abruptly abandoned Earth as if something scared them off.

The alien previously trapped inside Reddy's pantry enters the house and takes Morgan hostage. Recalling Colleen's dying words, Graham tells Merrill to "swing away" using his baseball bat. The alien sprays Morgan with toxic gas from its wrist. Graham recovers his stricken son as Merrill bashes the creature and smashes glasses of water at it, eventually killing it. Outside, Graham administers Morgan's medication, realizing that his son's constricted lungs prevented him from inhaling the toxins; an act that Graham attributes to the intervention from a higher power.

Months later, the Hess family has recovered from the ordeal and Graham returns to the church.

Cast
 Mel Gibson as Father Graham Hess, a farmer and former Episcopal priest. His wife Colleen died six months prior. He is Merrill's older brother and father to son Morgan and daughter Bo.
 Joaquin Phoenix as Merrill Hess, Graham's younger brother; Colleen's brother-in-law; and uncle of Morgan and Bo. He has been living with the family since Colleen's death; he is a former minor league baseball player.
 Rory Culkin as Morgan Hess, the son of Graham and Colleen Hess; older brother to sister Bo; and nephew to Merrill.
 Abigail Breslin as Bo Hess, the daughter of Graham and Colleen Hess; Morgan's younger sister; and niece to Merrill; she is the youngest of the Hess family.
 Cherry Jones as Caroline Paski, a local police officer and friend of the Hess family.
 M. Night Shyamalan as Ray Reddy, a veterinarian; he is responsible for Colleen's accidental death, for which he feels deeply remorseful.
 Patricia Kalember as Colleen Hess, Graham's deceased wife; mother of Morgan and Bo; and Merrill's sister-in-law; she is seen only in Graham's flashbacks.
 Ted Sutton as SFC Cunningham, an Army recruiter Merrill speaks to.
 Merritt Wever as Tracey Abernathy, a pharmacist who makes confession to a discomforted Graham.
 Lanny Flaherty as Carl Nathan, the crotchety owner of the bookstore in town.
 Marion McCorry as Mrs. Nathan, Carl Nathan’s wife.
 Michael Showalter as Lionel Prichard, a local troublemaker.
 Clifford David as a Columbia University professor viewed on television.

Production

M. Night Shyamalan was a fan of the film You Can Count on Me and cast Rory Culkin and Mark Ruffalo. Ruffalo required surgery for a tumor behind his ear and was unable to work on the film, so a week before filming the role was recast with Joaquin Phoenix. the role of Graham was originally written to be an older man, Shyamalan approached Paul Newman for the role but declined as he wasn't interested. and he also approached Clint Eastwood but he also declined due to scheduling conflicts.

Shyamalan has said that the film's concept is the combination of two ideas - a family finding a crop circle on their property, and an "end of the world" premise.

Signs was filmed in 2001. All scenes shot on location were filmed in Bucks County, Pennsylvania. The scenes of the house and cornfield were shot inside the campus of Delaware Valley University, an agricultural college, where they had 40 acres of land to use. The scenes in the bookstore and the pizza shop were filmed in Newtown, Pennsylvania, and the pharmacy scene was shot in Morrisville, Pennsylvania.

Soundtrack
All music was composed by James Newton Howard. The score was conducted by Pete Anthony and performed by the Hollywood Studio Symphony.

Track listing

Critical reception for soundtrack

The soundtrack generally received positive reviews. William Ruhlmann of Allmusic stated in his review that: With Signs, composer James Newton Howard again joins director M. Night Shyamalan for their third collaboration following The Sixth Sense and Unbreakable, and clearly the film presents another thrilling encounter with the supernatural. From his opening "Main Theme," Howard ratchets up the tension, and his music thereafter alternates only between the ominous and the suspenseful. He overloads his lower tones, employing eight basses, five percussionists, and even a tuba, but also uses a large string section for short, fast, repetitive figures meant to keep viewers on the edges of their seats. This is not particularly imaginative music, just good old Saturday afternoon scary movie fare, the only distinguishing characteristic about it -- consistent with Shyamalan's style -- that it is so relentless. There's just no let up; dread pervades every moment of the director's films, to the point of emotional exhaustion for some, and the score has to have the same uncompromising approach, which can make it a little hard to take when listened to all the way through.

Reception

Critical response

On Rotten Tomatoes the film has an approval rating of 75% based on reviews from 237 critics, with an average rating of 6.80/10. The site's critical consensus reads, "With Signs, Shyamalan proves once again an expert at building suspense and giving audiences the chills." On Metacritic, the film scored 59 out of 100 based on 36 reviews, indicating "mixed or average reviews". Audiences polled by CinemaScore gave the film an average grade of "B" on an A+ to F scale.

Roger Ebert gave the film four out of four stars, writing "M. Night Shyamalan's Signs is the work of a born filmmaker, able to summon apprehension out of thin air. When it is over, we think not how little has been decided, but how much has been experienced ... At the end of the film, I had to smile, recognizing how Shyamalan has essentially ditched a payoff. He knows, as we all sense, that payoffs have grown boring." Nell Minow of Common Sense Media gave the film four out of five stars; she praised the casting and Shyamalan's direction, saying his "only flaw was not leaving anything to the audience's imagination".

Mike LaSalle of the San Francisco Chronicle gave the film one star out of four, thinking that the film had "few thoughts and no thrills." Varietys Todd McCarthy criticised the film for its lack of originality, writing "After the overwrought Unbreakable and now the meager Signs, it's fair to speculate whether Shyamalan's persistence in replicating the otherworldly formula of The Sixth Sense might not be a futile and self-defeating exercise." A.O. Scott of The New York Times wrote that "Mr. Shyamalan is undone by his pretensions" and that the theme of paternal grief "is articulated here with a heavy-handed, incoherent sentimentality that smothers real emotion." On the theme of faith he concludes "Mr. Shyamalan never gives us anything to believe in, other than his own power to solve problems of his own posing, and his command of a narrative logic is as circular -- and as empty -- as those bare patches out in the cornfield."

In 2004, the film was listed as No. 77 on Bravo's The 100 Scariest Movie Moments for the Brazilian birthday party scene.

Box office
Signs grossed $60,117,080 from 3,264 theaters in its opening weekend. At the time of its release, the film had the second-highest August opening weekend, behind Rush Hour 2. It was the biggest opening weekend of Mel Gibson's career and earned more than Disney's previous best for a live-action non-sequel, not based on existing popular source material, held by Pearl Harbor. The film went on to gross $227,966,634 domestically and $180,281,283 internationally, for a total of $408,247,917 worldwide. It ranked only behind The Sixth Sense in Shyamalan's box office success and grossing more than The Village and Split.

Home media
Signs was released on VHS and DVD on January 7, 2003.

The DVD release includes some deleted scenes:
 Flashbacks 1 and 2: Two scenes with Graham's wife, Colleen. In the first, she sits with a toddler Morgan and baby Bo in a rocking chair while Graham watches. In the second, she dances with him. She hums the same tune in both scenes.
 The dead bird: With no sound, this scene shows Graham going back home from Ray's, and after a short time, a dead bird near the road (after supposedly hitting an invisible forcefield) is shown.
 The attic door and the third story: The longest deleted scene, it starts with Merrill finding out about the not-boarded attic door. Despite Graham's efforts to call him back, Merrill goes up the stairs and manages to hold the door by climbing up a chair and putting his hands at the door. Trying to help, Graham looks for a way to hold the door. He gets a tall shelf and places it under the door. Knowing this is only a temporary solution, Graham gets his family and takes them to the kitchen and puts some chairs at the door to hold the aliens out of the room. There, he tells the "third story", about Merrill, in which he dislocated his arm. While Graham is telling the story, the shelf is destroyed from the attic door slamming on top of it repeatedly and the aliens gain access to the house. Everyone goes down to the basement, the only safe room available, as the aliens begin forcing the kitchen door open.

It was the second top DVD video rental in the United States during the first quarter of 2003, earning  in US DVD rental revenue by March 2003.

See also

 List of films featuring extraterrestrials

References

External links

 
 

2002 films
2000s English-language films
2002 horror films
2002 science fiction films
2000s psychological horror films
2000s science fiction horror films
Alien invasions in films
American science fiction horror films
Blinding Edge Pictures films
Films about asthma
Films about extraterrestrial life
Films about families
Films about widowhood
Films directed by M. Night Shyamalan
Films produced by Frank Marshall
Films produced by M. Night Shyamalan
Films produced by Sam Mercer
Films scored by James Newton Howard
Films set on farms
Films set in Pennsylvania
Films shot in Pennsylvania
Films with screenplays by M. Night Shyamalan
Religious horror films
The Kennedy/Marshall Company films
Touchstone Pictures films
2000s American films